The Montreal experiments were a series of experiments, initially aimed to treat schizophrenia by changing memories and erasing the patients' thoughts using Donald salutallo's method of “psychic driving”,  as well as drug-induced sleep, intensive electroconvulsive therapy, sensory deprivation and Thorazine. The experiments were conducted at the Allan Memorial Institute of McGill University between 1957 and 1964 by the Scottish psychiatrist Donald Ewen Cameron and funded by the CIA as part of Project MKUltra, which lasted until 1973 and was only revealed to the public in 1975.

The patients of this experiment expected positive changes from Cameron's treatment. However, these patients suffered severely under conditions that were not in accordance with human rights. Not only the patients but also their families show long lasting effects on their mental health. Some of these symptoms include retrograde amnesia as well as impairments in every day life abilities such as self-care.

To this day, the topic of the experiments of Montreal has been kept in the dark by the CIA, who actively prevent information about these experiments from being leaked to the public, whether that be through destruction of files or signing non-disclosure agreements.

Whether or not Cameron was aware that funding for his experiments was coming from the CIA is unclear; it has been argued that he would have carried out the exact same experiments if funding had come from a source without ulterior motives.

Donald Ewen Cameron 

Donald Ewen Cameron was the key figure in the Montreal experiments.

Cameron was born on December 24, 1901, in Scotland and graduated from the University of Glasgow in 1924. In 1929 he moved to Canada where he worked in the Brandon Mental Hospital in Manitoba as the physician in charge. In 1938 he received his diploma in psychiatry and became professor of neurology, psychiatry at University at Albany and began his research on sensory deprivation and memory.

In 1953 he developed his theory of “psychic driving” to cure schizophrenia which he later used on his patients under the Project MKUltra, with the codename “Subproject 68” for which he was recruited by the CIA in 1957. He was paid $69,000 through the front company “Society for the Investigation of Human Ecology” from 1957 to 1964 to carry out these experiments, as well as receiving "more than $500,000 between 1950 and 1965" from the federal government. He suddenly left the project four years before the end of his contract.

In 1961 he became president of the World Psychiatric Association after he had already been the president of both the American Psychiatric Association as well as the Canadian Psychiatric Association.

In 1967 he died of a heart attack.

Treatment 
With the goal of inducing lifelong changes in humans, Cameron used different methods of depatterning and repatterning the brain. The procedures included psychic driving, drug-induced sleep, intensive electroconvulsive therapy, sensory deprivation and the administration of neuroleptic Thorazine.

Drug-Induced Sleep

Cameron used doses of thorazine to put patients into an artificial coma.

The drug-induced sleep, which took place in the “sleep room”, usually lasted from a few days up to 86 days; longer than expected by the patients. Cameron often combined the sleep periods with injections of hallucinogenic drugs (e.g. LSD), as well as administration of electroshocks and the playing of pre-recorded messages into patients' ears.

Electroconvulsive Therapy (ECT)

Electroconvulsive therapy (also called electroshock therapy) is a procedure used to treat psychological disorders like treatment-resistant depression.

Another way of depatterning the brain was intensive electroconvulsive therapy (electroshock therapy). Usually, 2 to 3 daily sessions were ordered, consisting of six 150-Volt shocks that lasted one second. After 30-40 daily sessions, Cameron progressively reduced the sessions and finished the treatment after a two-year follow up program with one session per month.

Sensory Deprivation

Inspired by Donald Hebb's experiment on sensory deprivation and human cognition, Cameron included these techniques in his treatment program. Patients were deprived of their senses by covering ears, eyes and/or skin. Furthermore, patients were given little food, water and oxygen, and instead injected with drugs (LSD, curare) to keep them in a paralyzed state.

Psychic Driving

In order to repattern the brain, patients had to listen to specific recordings of Cameron repeatedly. This process took place for up to 16 hours a day, and over the whole period messages could be repeated up to half a million times altogether. For the first ten days, recordings contained personal, negative messages, which were followed by ten days of positive messages.

Anxiety that would emerge in patients was countered with heavy doses of sedating drugs such as Sodium Amytal and Largactil.

Patients 
It is unknown how many people participated in the Montreal Experiments exactly, but over 300 people applied for compensation in 1992 with the Canadian Government. The participants of the experiment mainly had mental health issues like depression and schizophrenia, and were hoping to get treated for these illnesses by Donald Ewen Cameron. None of them had given informed consent to the procedures, or were aware of the experiments being conducted. This was a gross violation of the Nuremberg Code, a code of ethics set up after World War II. Children and adults from many social backgrounds were treated, most of them for up to three years.

Participants often suffered from retrograde amnesia for the rest of their lives and had to relearn most skills they had. Many were in a childlike state and even had to be potty-trained. Family described them as even more emotionally unstable as before and some of them were unable to live a normal life afterwards. One such patient was Jean Steel, whose daughter said that she never returned to be the same woman ever again. Jean would sit alone in the dark, write codes on the walls, and according to her daughter, "her emotions were stripped. It took away her soul."

Aftermath 
Project MKUltra officially ended in 1973, around the time that the Watergate scandal broke.

It wasn't until 1975 that the general public were informed about the extent of CIA meddling, largely due to the involvement of the Church Committee, which was tasked with the investigation of “the extent, if any, to which illegal, improper, or unethical activities were engaged in by any agency of the Federal Government,"

During the 1977 Senate Hearing on MKUltra, Senator Edward “Ted” Kennedy called for the release of all documents pertaining to MKUltra, saying “the best way to put this period behind us, obviously, is to have the full information…” The Senate Hearing also allowed the CIA Director of the time, Stansfield Turner, to give his prepared statement and to elaborate on the discovery of seven boxes of information related to Project MKUltra, most of which turned out to consist of "approvals for advance of funds, vouchers, accountings, and the like - most of which are not very informative as to the nature of the activities that were undertaken." This made it very difficult to judge the extent of CIA involvement with the Montreal Experiments.

More information was revealed in the Canadian CBC documentary series “The Fifth Estate”. In 1980, they released a first episode about Project MKUltra, which not only held the testimony of two Canadian patients who'd undergone the treatment speaking out for the first time, but also the revelation that Ottawa had aided to suppress information that CIA officials had apologised to the Canadian government following the initial revelation of the experimentation. The second episode, released in 2017, focuses on the present-day struggle of the victims to receive compensation, the hindrances made to prevent them from speaking out about their experiences, and the efforts of the CIA and Canadian government to keep their involvement hidden. Mentioned in particular are a 1988 class action settlement made by the victims against world s most committed CIA, which they won, receiving 67,000 US dollars each, and a 1992 compensation from the Canadian government, in which 77 individuals received 100,000 US dollars each, but signed away their right to sue the government or the hospital. This compensation did not extend to 250 other victims, denied for not being "tortured enough, applied too late or because they couldn't produce medical records."

To this day, neither the Canadian government nor the CIA have issued formal apologies for their involvement and funding of Project MKUltra or the Montreal experiments. In 2017, the Canadian government reached an out-of-court settlement with the daughter of one of the patients, paying 100,000 US dollars in exchange for dropping the legal case, and signing a non-disclosure agreement which would prevent her from talking about the settlement.

Criticism 
There is no clear evidence of what really happened in the Montreal Experiments. None of Cameron's personal files concerning his experiments survived. Other documents which would verify the Montreal Experiments either no longer exist or are still classified. Most of the information on the experiments is rooted in reports of patients, especially their journals or court reports.

References 

Clinical research ethics
Experimental psychology
Human rights abuses in Canada
Human rights abuses in the United States
Human subject research in psychiatry
Human subject research in Canada
Human subject research in the United States
Psychiatric assessment
Schizophrenia